Philautus kerangae is a species of frog in the family Rhacophoridae.
It is found in Malaysia, possibly Brunei, and possibly Indonesia.
Its natural habitats are subtropical or tropical moist lowland forests and swamps.
It is threatened by habitat loss.

References

External links
 Sound recordings of Philautus kerangae at BioAcoustica

Kerangae
Amphibians described in 1987
Taxonomy articles created by Polbot